Enspel is an Ortsgemeinde – a community belonging to a Verbandsgemeinde – in the Westerwaldkreis in Rhineland-Palatinate, Germany.

Geography

Enspel lies 10 km northwest of Westerburg on a bank on the west slope of the Stöffel, a basalt mountain. The community's structure is based on the nearby basalt quarries which were worked beginning about 1900. Worth seeing are the mighty crevices and outcrops in the Stöffel. Since 1972 Enspel has belonged to what was then the newly founded Verbandsgemeinde of Westerburg, a kind of collective municipality.

History
In 1261, Enspel had its first documentary mention. In the 20th century, the famous Stöffelmaus was found. This was a fossil of a now extinct gliding rodent, Eomys quercyi.

Politics

The municipal council is made up of 9 council members, including the extraofficial mayor (Bürgermeister), who were elected in a majority vote in a municipal election on 7 June 2009.

Economy and infrastructure

Transport
South of the community runs Bundesstraße 255 leading from Montabaur to Herborn. The nearest Autobahn interchange is Montabaur on the A 3 (Cologne–Frankfurt). Enspel lies on the Oberwesterwaldbahn (railway) to Limburg and Au (Sieg). From there, the cities of Cologne, Koblenz, Frankfurt am Main and Wiesbaden may be reached directly. The nearest InterCityExpress stop is the railway station at Montabaur on the Cologne-Frankfurt high-speed rail line.

Public institutions
Fire brigade
"Stöffelhalle" village association house
"Am Stöffel" Guesthouse – self-catering
Blockhütte (cabin)
Jugendraum (“Youth Room”)
Football area
Two playgrounds
Entrance to Stöffel-Park

References

External links
 Enspel 

Municipalities in Rhineland-Palatinate
Westerwaldkreis